Dimitar Mirakovski  (born May 14, 1981), is a former Macedonian professional basketball player.

Pro career 
Since beginning his professional career in 1999, Mirakovski has spent the majority of his career playing in the Macedonian Premier League. He has also made brief stops in Kosovo with BC Peje, Bulgaria with CSKA Sofia and Greece with Rethymno BC. He is signed with KK Kavadarci of the Macedonian Premier League for the 2009-10 season after spending the 2008-09 season in Greece.

Macedonian national team 
Mirakovski is also a member of the Macedonian national basketball team.  He competed with the team at Eurobasket 2009 and helped the team to a ninth-place finish, its best ever performance at the continental championship at that time.

References

External links
Dimitar Mirakovski at eurobasket.com
Dimitar Mirakovski at fiba.com

1981 births
Living people
Macedonian men's basketball players
Point guards
Sportspeople from Strumica
KK Rabotnički players
KK Vardar players
BC Cherkaski Mavpy players
Rethymno B.C. players
KB Peja players